Charlottetown-Victoria Park is a provincial electoral district for the Legislative Assembly of Prince Edward Island, Canada. It was previously known as Charlottetown-Kings Square.

Members
The riding has elected the following Members of the Legislative Assembly:

Election results

Charlottetown-Victoria Park, 2007–present

2016 electoral reform plebiscite results

Charlottetown-Kings Square, 1996–2007

References

 Charlottetown-Victoria Park information

Politics of Charlottetown
Prince Edward Island provincial electoral districts
1996 establishments in Prince Edward Island